Chainat United Football Club (Thai ชัยนาท ยูไนเต็ด), is a Thai football club based in Chai Nat Province, Thailand. The club is currently playing in the Thai League 3. The head coach of the club is Firdaus Kassim

Stadium and locations by season

Record

References

 Chainat United news
 http://team.7mth.com/116048/index.shtml
 Chainat United news 2

External links
 

Association football clubs established in 2016
Football clubs in Thailand
Chai Nat province
2016 establishments in Thailand